CasinoFloor.com is an online casino website operated by EveryMatrix Ltd., a Malta based company licensed and regulated by the Lotteries and Gaming Authority of Malta. It offers traditional and new casino games on computers and mobile devices. Casinofloor.com is powered by HTML5 web-based graphics technology.

Rio Ferdinand, a former England captain and Premium League Footballer, is the brand ambassador of casinofloor.com.

History

Casinofloor.com is managed and operated through EveryMatrix Ltd., a Malta based independent company providing software solutions to the iGaming industry. It was registered in May 2004 (Registration Number: C44411) and obtained a license from the Lotteries & Gaming Authority of Malta (License no: LGA/CL2/497/2008) on 3rd Feb, 2009.

Awards

Casinofloor.com received the Best Casino Award 2013  presented by norskcasino.com, Norway’s guide to online casinos.

References

External links
Official site

Online gambling companies of Malta